This is a list of famous roads, streets and avenues in and around Dhaka.

 Airport Road
 B. K. Dash Road
 Bailey Road
 Bangabandhu Avenue
 Begum Rokeya Avenue
 Indira Road
 Madani Avenue
 Mirpur Road
 Nawabpur Road
 New Elephant road
 Panthapath
 Purbachal Expressway
 Rishikesh Das Road
 Sat Masjid Road
 Sonargaon Janapath Road

References

 
Roads
Dhaka